The Thelon Wildlife Sanctuary, at , over twice the area of Belgium, is the largest wildlife refuge in Canada. It is located in northern Canada's Arctic region, north of the tree line, straddling the Northwest Territories and Nunavut, halfway between Baker Lake and Yellowknife, and bordered on the north between the Baillie River on the west and the Consul River at the east by the Back River. It is the namesake of the Thelon River, whose river valley is resplendent with boreal forest biological diversity, hence its identification as a "Biological Site of Universal Importance" by the International Biological Program (IBP) in the 1960s.

It was expanded in 1956 to its present size, and is home to the most northernly known moose above the tree line. In addition, the wildlife sanctuary is home to barren-ground caribou (Beverly and Bathurst herds), Arctic wolf, Arctic fox, wolverine, Arctic squirrel (sicsic), barren ground grizzly bear and waterfowl.

The "Thelon Oasis" is a section of the wildlife sanctuary along the Thelon River valley between Warden Grove (the Thelon's confluence with Hanbury River) and Hornby Point. Even though it is north of the Arctic tree line, the area supports thick white spruce tree groves, raspberry, currant, and columbine plants, along with tall alluvial dwarf willow thickets and tag alder. Scientists believe the causes of this unusual proliferation of plants more common to subarctic areas include favorable fine-textured soils and climatic oasis effect, higher summer temperatures due to northward elevation fall and the absence of large lakes.

The wildlife sanctuary is also the ancestral home of Akilinirmiut, Inuit of the Akiliniq, a hilly area by the shores of Beverly Lake (Tipjalik). While there are many lakes within the Thelon Wildlife Sanctuary, Beverly Lake is notable as the widening of the Thelon River at its northeastern border within the wildlife sanctuary, and the end of the spruce tree groves.

The wildlife sanctuary teems with game but is a hunting free zone, with support from the Inuit of Baker Lake.

A study of the history of the sanctuary would do well to include studying British explorer John Hornby (1880–1927).

References

Videography
 LaRose, John. The Place Where God Began The Thelon Wildlife Sanctuary, a Northern Oasis. [Ottawa, Ont.]: Summerhill Entertainment, 2000.

External links
Official web site
Map1, Map2
Historical Timeline of the Northwest Territories 1928 - William Hoare and the Thelon Game Sanctuary, Prince of Wales Northern Heritage Centre

South Slave Region
Parks in Kivalliq Region
Parks in the Northwest Territories
Wildlife sanctuaries of Nunavut
Protected areas established in 1927
1927 establishments in the Northwest Territories